The  (lit. the department of governance affairs) was a division of the eighth century Japanese government of the Imperial Court in Kyoto), and it is sometimes identified as the "Ministry of the Interior".

History
It was instituted as part of the Taika Reforms and Ritsuryō laws in the Asuka period and formalized during the Heian period.  It was previously called Osamuru-tsukasa. The ministry was replaced in the Meiji period. Today the Board of Ceremonies (宮内庁式部職 ; Shikibu shoku) of the Imperial Household Agency is the successor.

Overview
The ministry was organized to address the ceremonial aspects of the Imperial year, to manage the ceremonial nature of formal relations with China, Korea, and other nations, and to oversee the maintenance of Imperial tombs and mausoleums. The ceremonies of the Imperial Household evolved over time.

The ambit of the Ministry's activities encompasses, for example:
 maintenance of the roster of names of officials
 oversight of the succession and marriage of officials of and above the fifth grade of rank
 oversight of formalities relating to deaths, funerals and the granting of posthumous rank
 management of the memorial activities which honor the anniversaries of the demise of a former Emperor 
 monitoring and recording of the names of all the former Emperors, so that none of those names shall be used by any of the succeeding Emperors nor by any subject
 adjudication of disputes about the order of precedence of the various families  
 supervision of all matters relating to the music  
 registration of names of Buddhistic temples, priests and nuns  
 reception and entertainment of foreigners and managing to their presentation to the Emperor 
 maintenance of the imperial sepulchers (misasagi) and royal burial mounds (kofun), including oversight of those in attendance upon them.

This ministry was also responsible for rules for noble families above the fifth rank.

Hierarchy
The top ritsuryō officials within this ministry structure were:
 .
 .
 
 
 
 
 
 
 
 .
 , two positions
 .  This official is charged with receiving ambassadors from China and Korea and serving as interpreters for them.
 
 , two positions
 , two positions
 , two positions
 , two positions 
 , two positions
 , two positions

See also
 Daijō-kan
 Ministry of Ceremonies (Han dynasty)

Notes

References
 Kawakami, Karl Kiyoshi. (1903). The Political Ideas of the Modern Japan.  Iowa City, Iowa: University of Iowa Press. OCLC 466275784.   Internet Archive, full text
 Nussbaum, Louis Frédéric and Käthe Roth. (2005). Japan Encyclopedia. Cambridge: Harvard University Press. ; OCLC 48943301
 Titsingh, Isaac. (1834). Nihon Odai Ichiran; ou,  Annales des empereurs du Japon.  Paris: Royal Asiatic Society, Oriental Translation Fund of Great Britain and Ireland.  OCLC 5850691
 Varley, H. Paul. (1980).  Jinnō Shōtōki: A Chronicle of Gods and Sovereigns. New York: Columbia University Press. ;  OCLC 59145842

Government of feudal Japan
Meiji Restoration
Ceremonies